Francis Mastin Wright (July 14, 1810 – January 16, 1869) was a Republican politician in the U.S. State of Ohio who was Ohio State Auditor (1856–1860).

Francis Wright was born in Frederick County, Virginia, and ended up in Clark County, Ohio, where he was educated in the country schools. He was a merchant in Springfield, Ohio and later Urbana, Ohio. He was elected as a Whig for County Auditor of Champaign County.

In 1855, as a Republican, he defeated incumbent Democrat William Duane Morgan for Ohio State Auditor, but declined a second term. He returned to Urbana in 1860, and was appointed Internal Revenue Collector by President Lincoln. He resigned in 1867 and died at Urbana January 16, 1869.

Notes

References

County auditors in the United States
Ohio Republicans
People from Clark County, Ohio
People from Urbana, Ohio
1810 births
1869 deaths
State Auditors of Ohio
Ohio Whigs
19th-century American politicians
19th-century American businesspeople